"Take Me as I Am" is a song written by Bob DiPiero and Karen Staley, and recorded by American country music artist Faith Hill.  It was released in September 1994 as the fourth and final single and title track from her album of the same name.  The song peaked at number 2 on the Billboard country singles charts, behind Joe Diffie's "Pickup Man", and number 2 on the RPM country charts in Canada.

Critical reception
Larry Flick from Billboard wrote, "Cleanup single from Hill's smash debut takes full advantage of her sunny style and impressive vocal range. Sure to please radio, this single should set the stage for her upcoming sophomore effort."

Music video
A music video was produced to promote the single, directed by Deaton Flanigen, and premiered in late 1994.

Charts

References

1994 singles
1993 songs
Faith Hill songs
Songs written by Bob DiPiero
Music videos directed by Deaton-Flanigen Productions
Warner Records Nashville singles
Songs written by Karen Staley